Panino is a rural locality (a village) in Kosinskoye Rural Settlement, Kosinsky District, Perm Krai, Russia. The population was 73 as of 2010. There are 3 streets.

Geography 
Panino is located 34 km north of Kosa (the district's administrative centre) by road. Nyatyaino is the nearest rural locality.

References 

Rural localities in Kosinsky District